Das Feuerwerk (The Firework) is a musical comedy in three acts by Paul Burkhard. It is a Standard German version  of the theatre piece Der schwarze Hecht, performed in Swiss German, which premiered in 1939 at Schauspielhaus Zürich, and originally draws inspiration from the comedy De sächzigscht Giburtstag by Emil Sautter. The libretto was written by Erik Charell, Jürg Amstein and Robert Gilbert. Das Feuerwerk premiered on 16 May 1950 at Staatstheater am Gärtnerplatz in Munich.

Orchestra and vocal roles
The orchestra comprises a flute, an oboe, two clarinets, a bassoon, two French horns, two trumpets, a trombone, a harp, a piano and strings. To perform in a smaller theatre, the composer also gave the option for two pianos and percussion, and even the latter can be left out. The work is set for singing actors rather than speaking actors.

The roles are as follows:

 Albert Oberholzer, factory owner
 Karline Oberholzer, his wife
 Anna, their daughter
 Kati, the Oberholzers' cook
 Josef, household help
 Fritz Oberholzer, farmer
 Berta, his wife
 Gustav Oberholzer, councillor
 Paula, his wife
 Heinrich Oberholzer, professor
 Klara, his wife 
 Alexander Oberholzer, alias circus director Obolski
 Iduna, his wife
 Herbert Klusmann, ship owner
 Lisa, his wife
 Robert, the Oberholzers' gardener (in love with Anna)
 A groom
 circus audience, including children

In the abbreviated version, the roles of Heinrich, Klara, Herbert and Lisa are combined into two people, whereby Heinrich's wife is called Lisa.

Plot

The musical comedy is set in the villa and garden of factory owner Albert Oberholzer, at the start of the twentieth century. Oberholzer is celebrating his 60th birthday with his family (NB in some settings it is his 50th birthday being celebrated). Preparations are well under way. Anna, Oberholzer's daughter, is rehearsing a song written especially for the occasion with Kati, the household cook. Aunt Berta and her husband Fritz arrive first. Anna and Kati have scarcely restarted their rehearsal when the arrival of Aunt Paula with Uncle Gustav and Aunt Lisa with Uncle Heinrich disturbs them again.

After the greetings, Anna and Kati want to perform their song, but another arrival interrupts them, that of Oberholzer's brother Alexander, the black sheep of the family, with his wife Iduna. Alexander has become the director of a travelling circus and calls himself Obolski; he has much with which to regale. His wife Iduna tells of her father's talents as a clown.

In a dream scene, Anna's aunts appear as the circus's big cats in an arena. The uncles, acting as clowns, make the audience laugh. Iduna rides a horse and Anna swings on a trapeze. Anna decides to run away with the circus. Robert cannot understand the actions of his beloved, but this does not change her mind. The men of the party dance around Iduna and shower her with compliments.

Iduna confides in Anna that behind the glamour of the circus there is also a darker side, and that she craves a more permanent existence. Anna recognises that she is perhaps not made for the travelling life. Her father is so delighted with her change of mind that he finally gives his approval for her engagement to Robert.

Musical highlights 
Das Feuerwerk was Paul Burkhard's most successful work. The song O mein Papa (Oh my father) became particularly famous; an English-language version by Eddie Fisher "Oh! My Pa-Pa" made it to Number One in the US in 1954.

Further well-known songs were

"Ich hab‘ ein kleines süsses Pony" ("I have a sweet little pony")
"Ich sag‘ es gern durch die Blume" ("I'm happy to say it among the flowers")
"Ein Leben lang verliebt" ("A lifetime in love")
"Die Welt ist gross und weit" ("The world is great and wide")

The work, which was published under the genre of musical comedy, is reminiscent both in music and subject of American musicals and therefore marks a departure from the traditional operetta in German theatre entertainment of the 1950s.

Film adaptations

Director Kurt Hoffmann filmed the musical comedy in 1954 with Lilli Palmer, Romy Schneider, Karl Schönböck and Claus Biederstaedt in the main roles.

External links
 Das Feuerwerk  www.felix-bloch-erben.de (Verlag für Bühne, Film und Funk)

1950 musicals
German musicals